Blendtec is an American company that sells commercial and residential blenders. It is a division of K-TEC, Inc. Blendtec was founded in 1975 by Tom Dickson, and  still operates primarily from Orem, Utah, United States.

Marketing
Blendtec is popularly known for its Will It Blend? viral marketing campaign, where Dickson blends various non-food items, including iPods, iPhones, marbles, golf balls, and remote controls. Dickson was featured in “How I Made My Millions”, a CNBC series covering individuals who founded and grew successful businesses.

History
In February 2006, Blendtec sued Vitamix Corporation for infringing its patents on Blendtec's "Wild Side" jar design, which Vitamix had allegedly copied as its own MP and XP containers. The court concluded Vitamix had infringed Blendtec's patents, and awarded Blendtec total damages of approximately $24 million, the largest patent-related penalty in the history of Utah.

In July 2013, Blendtec won the 2013 Gold Innovation Award for innovations delivered by Blendtec's Signature Series and Stealth lines of blenders.

In June 2017, the company was awarded the 2017 Kitchen Innovations Award for its Nitro Blending System.

Blendtec is the parent company of the nutrition company Blendfresh, which was launched on July 14, 2014.

In 2021, the Blendtec founding family sold majority share of the company to Wasatch Group.

Products

Home blenders
 Classic 575 
 Designer 650
 Designer 650 S
 Professional 800
 Total Blender Classic

Commercial blenders
 Connoisseur 825 Spacesaver
 Connoisseur 825
 Stealth
 Stealth Nitro
 Stealth X
 Stealth Nitro X

Commercial dispensers & self serve machines
 BDI
 BI
 BD8
 D8
 RealSmooth

Jars
 WildSide+ Jar
 Wildside Flow Jar
 Mini WildSide Jar
 FourSide Jar
 Twister Jar
 Margarita Jar
 Blendtec GO

See also
 Will It Blend?

References

External links

 

American companies established in 1975
Manufacturing companies established in 1975
Kitchenware brands
Manufacturing companies based in Utah
1975 establishments in Utah
Companies based in Orem, Utah
Home appliance manufacturers of the United States